Chintaman Vinayak Vaidya (18 October 1861– 20 April 1938) was a Marathi-language historian and writer from Maharashtra, India. He was Chief Justice of Gwalior State for a period. He was born in a Chitpavan Brahmin family.

In 1908, Vaidya chaired the Marathi Sahitya Sammelan held in  Pune. Later, he became involved in the nationalist Congress Democratic Party, which was led by Lokmanya Bal Gangadhar Tilak.

Works
The following is a list of the titles of his major works:
 Samagra Awalonnati Lekhamālā  (1906)
 Mahābhārat — Samālochan (1914)
 Mahābhārat — A Criticism
 Nibandha Aṇi Bhāshaṇẽ  (1915)
 Vālmīki-Rāmāyaṇ Parīkshaṇ (1920)
 Madhyayugīn Bhārat, Athawā, Hindu Rājyāñchā Udbhav, Utkarsh, Aṇi Uchchhed (1920)
 History of Mediaeval Hindu India, Being a History of India From 600 to 1200 A.D. (in three volumes) (Poona: Oriental Book Supplying Agency, 1921-1926)
 Downfall of Hindu India
 Shrī Kru̥shṇa Charitra (1922)
 Sanskrut Wāngmayāchā Troṭak Itihās (1922)
 Shriman Mahābhāratāche Marāṭhī Suras Bhāshāntar (1922)
 Durdaivī Raṅgū, Athawā, Pānipatachā Shewaṭacha Saṅgrām (1924) - a work of fiction based on the Third Battle of Panipat
 Early History of Rajputs (750 to 1000 A.D.) (Poona, 1924)
 Shrī Rām Charitra (1926)
 History of Sanskrit Literature (1930)
 Hindu Dharmāchi Tatwe, Arthāt, Yāsambandhĩ̄ Niranirāḷyā Wishayānwar Vaidyāni Dileli Wyākhāne Va Lihilele Lekh (1931)
 Vaidyānche Aitihāsik Nibandha (1931)
 Marāṭhā Swarājya Sãsthāpak Shrī Shivājī Mahārāj (1932)
 Shivaji – The Founder of  Maratha Swaraj
 Saṅgīt Sãyogitā Nāṭak, Arthāt, Patinishṭhā (1934)
 Epic India, or, India As Described in the Mahabharat and the Ramayan (in two volumes)
 The Riddle of the Rāmāyaṇ
 Marāṭhī Bhāshechi Utpatti

References 
Citations

Bibliography

External links
 

Marathi-language writers
1861 births
1938 deaths
Chief justices
Presidents of the Akhil Bharatiya Marathi Sahitya Sammelan